Nandu Madhav is an Indian actor known for his works in Marathi cinema and theatre. He is known for the his titular role in  Paresh Mokashi's Harishchandrachi Factory which won the Best Feature Film in Marathi award in the 56th National Film Awards in 2008.

Early life
Nandu Madhav completed his school training in Gevrai, Beed district. He earned his BSc and LL.B. (gen) degrees from Dr. Babasaheb Ambedkar Marathwada University in Aurangabad, Maharashtra.

Career
Madhav  played a role in the Marathi movie Bangarwadi (1995). Madhav has also appeared in Hindi movies such as Daayraa and Jis Desh Mein Ganga Rehta Hain. He is also known for his role of an educated villager fighting for justice in the 1998 hit film Sarkarnama.

In 2012, He coordinated a play called Shivaji Underground in Bhimnagar Mohalla, which attempts to shed light on legacy appropriation of Maratha King Chhatrapati Shivaji.

Filmography

Plays

Awards For Movie

Drama Awards

References

External links 
 

Living people
Male actors from Maharashtra
Marathi actors
Year of birth missing (living people)
Male actors in Hindi cinema